Sergeant First Class Elizabeth Marks (born August 7, 1990) is an American Paralympic swimmer who specializes in the 100m breaststroke distance.

Early life 
Marks was born to James Marks, a U.S. Marine veteran who served during the Vietnam War. She graduated high school at age 16 before attending community colleges in Arizona.

Marks joined the U.S. Army in July 2008 aged 17 and earned the military occupational specialty 68W, Health Care Specialist. While deployed in Iraq in 2010 she suffered bilateral hip injuries that left her disabled; she has a tattoo over most of her right leg.

Marks, then known by her married name Elizabeth Wasil, recovered from her injuries, first in Germany, then at Brooke Army Medical Center (BAMC) at Fort Sam Houston in San Antonio, Texas. 

While it initially appeared that Marks could be declared unfit for duty by Army medics, she set a goal to become fit for duty. She began swimming as way to complete additional physical therapy and cardio while at BAMC and obtained the fit for duty classification on July 3, 2012.

Career
Marks began competing in swimming competitions shortly after joining the U.S. Army World Class Athlete Program in July 2012.

In 2014, during the 2014 Invictus Games, she contracted a severe respiratory infection, which forced doctors at Papworth Hospital, United Kingdom to place her in a medically induced coma for one month. The infection left Marks with a reduced lung capacity and prolonged exercise can affect her vision.

Marks has won a gold medal at the 2015 Military World Games and four gold medals at the 2016 Invictus Games. After the ceremony, she privately asked Prince Harry, who had awarded her her Gold Medals, if he could present one of her Invictus gold medals to the Doctors and Nurses of Papworth Hospital who had saved her life. She qualified for the 2016 Summer Paralympics by clocking a time of 1:28.54 at the U.S. trials, which was only 0.01 seconds short of the world record. She won an individual gold and a relay bronze medal at the Paralympics.

In June 2021 the US announced the 34 Paralympic swimmers who would be going to the delayed 2020 Summer Paralympics in Tokyo. The women's team was Marks, Jessica Long, McKenzie Coan, Rebecca Meyers and Mallory Weggemann.

On April 14, 2022, Marks was named to the roster to represent the United States at the 2022 World Para Swimming Championships.

Personal life 
Marks is married to Mason Heibel.

Recognition
In 2016, Marks received the Pat Tillman Award for Service at the 2016 ESPY Awards, and,  the only active-duty soldier to receive the award.

In 2017, Marks was inducted into the U.S. Army Women's Foundation Hall of Fame.

References

External links

1990 births
Living people
American female breaststroke swimmers
American military Olympians
Paralympic swimmers of the United States
Paralympic gold medalists for the United States
Paralympic silver medalists for the United States
Paralympic bronze medalists for the United States
Paralympic medalists in swimming
Swimmers at the 2016 Summer Paralympics
Swimmers at the 2020 Summer Paralympics
Medalists at the 2016 Summer Paralympics
Medalists at the 2020 Summer Paralympics
Medalists at the World Para Swimming Championships
Sportspeople from Arizona
People from Yavapai County, Arizona
Military personnel from Arizona
United States Army personnel of the Iraq War
United States Army non-commissioned officers
U.S. Army World Class Athlete Program
S6-classified Paralympic swimmers
21st-century American women